is a Tendai Buddhist temple in Hyōgo Prefecture (formerly Harima province).

External links
Hōun-ji web site

Buddhist temples in Hyōgo Prefecture
Tendai temples